The Pericopina is a subtribe of tiger moths in the family Erebidae. The subtribe was described by Francis Walker in 1869.

Taxonomy
The subtribe was previously classified as the subfamily Pericopinae of the family Arctiidae.

Selected genera
The following genera are included in the subtribe.

Antiotricha
Are
Calodesma
Chetone
Composia
Crocomela
Ctenuchidia
Cyanarctia
Didaphne
Dysschema
Ephestris
Episcea
Euchlaenidia
Eucyanoides
Gnophaela
Heliactinidia
Hyalurga
Hypocrita
Isostola
Josiomorpha
Josiomorphoides
Mesenochroa
Notophyson
Phaloe
Phaloesia
Pseudophaloe
Pteroodes
Sagaropsis
Scearctia
Seileria
Sermyla
Sthenognatha
Syntomidopsis
Thermidarctia
Thyrgis
Xenosoma

References

 
Lepidoptera subtribes